Kutlu  is a common masculine Turkish given name. In Turkish, "Kutlu" means "holy", "hooly", and/or "blessed".

Given name 
 Kutlu Adalı, Turkish Cypriot journalist
 Kutlu Özmakinacı, bassist of Turkish rock band Yüksek Sadakat.
 Kutlu Torunlar, Turkish sailor.

Surname 
 Ayla Kutlu, Turkish author (see Turkish Wikipedia article).
 Hakan Kutlu, Turkish footballer

Places
 Kutlu, Düzce

Turkish-language surnames
Turkish masculine given names